"World War III" is the title of two comic book sagas published by DC Comics and involving many of the superheroes of the DC Universe. The first was published in 2000 as a story-arc in the JLA ongoing series; the second was published in 2007 as a limited series of its own.

JLA
The original "World War III" saga was a narrative arc of the JLA series written by Grant Morrison and drawn by Howard Porter in 2000 (over JLA #36-41), and currently in print as the JLA, Vol. 6: World War III paperback. This was the final arc written by Grant Morrison and provided explanation for hints dropped over his tenure about the importance of the JLA as "forerunners" in defending the Earth from an impending menace.

Lex Luthor, failing to defeat the JLA, formed a new Injustice Gang consisting not of villains who mimic the Justice League (JLA), but with villains that posed major threats to them in the past. The villains were (in order of recruitment) Prometheus, Queen Bee (Zazzala), and General Wade Eiling. With a deadly plan in mind, this new team was able to infiltrate the Watchtower via the Ghost Zone and defeat the JLA. As the JLA was about to fight back, they soon found out that the Injustice Gang were not doing these things under their own will, but were being controlled by an unknown force. The latter is revealed to be the cosmic entity Mageddon, an extremely ancient living weapon originally intended to be used for wars among primal cosmic gods. Mageddon had been influencing the thoughts of the population of Earth to promote a worldwide state of war, and ultimately aimed to destroy the planet.

The JLA rallies the help of many heroes of the DC universe, most notably that of Aztek (a Grant Morrison creation), who is blinded and sacrifices himself in the effort; it is revealed that Mageddon, under the name of "Tezcatlipoca", was indeed the menace Aztek was originally created to oppose. Finally, the JLA is able to confer superpowers to the population of the Earth, who unite in the decisive effort to vanquish Mageddon and save the planet, keeping it occupied long enough for Superman - trapped at the "heart" of Mageddon - to absorb the anti-sunlight powering Mageddon's systems and disable it for good.

52

The title World War III was also used in 2007 for a four-issue mini-series written by Keith Champagne (#1-2) and John Ostrander (#3-4), and drawn by Pat Olliffe and Tom Derenick, with covers by Ethan Van Sciver. It tells the story of Black Adam's rage against humanity after his family was murdered, and he can only be stopped when the entire superhero community rallies together. The limited series was a tie into DC's weekly comic book series, 52, occurring on "Week 50" of the series, which takes place during the missing year following Infinite Crisis. Indeed, 52 was conceived to explain many of the drastic changes that occurred in the DC Universe during that missing year; however, the series ultimately evolved in a different direction, focusing on its own cast of characters, and consequently, World War III was conceived to revisit the original intent of the series and explain the changes that occurred.

Synopsis
Five weeks before the main events of the series, Martian Manhunter tries to telepathically fight Black Adam following his near obliteration of Bialya, first disguising himself as a young girl, but is overwhelmed by his darkest memory and flees into space, from where he will observe the upcoming battle, which is narrated through his point of view.

During Week 50, Black Adam rampages all over the planet, killing many innocent citizens, leaving destruction and disease behind him. For example, the Leaning Tower of Pisa and many in the city are slain. Sydney, Australia is also devastated. The Great Pyramids are damaged.

Father Time unsuccessfully tries to stop him on American shores and his face is ripped off for his efforts (though he survives). In retaliation for the attack despite him not crossing America's borders, Black Adam throws an aircraft carrier at New York City.

Firestorm is forced out of retirement, along with Firehawk. Combined, the two turn the ship into snow. Nightwing (hinted to be Jason Todd while in the role by his ruthlessness) battles a gang of looters; his dialogue hints he kills them and is later seen with their money.

In the meantime, J'onn observes Supergirl return from the 31st century. Unstable from the time travel, she passes through J'onn. Her form stabilizes as she plunges to Earth.

Every hero then tries to do his/her best in their respective roles, with Harvey Dent defending Gotham from Killer Croc, the Doom Patrol trying to halt Black Adam's rampage in Pisa and Donna Troy taking over Wonder Woman's mantle. Black Adam defeats Captain Marvel Jr. and Mary Marvel. In Sub Diego the effects of the Geiss serum are wearing off, turning the population into air-breathers again, except for Aquagirl and a few others, who asks for the help of Aquaman. The latter confers with the sea-gods, Poseidon and Triton, asking for the power to save the Sub Diegoans. The gods, while denying any involvement with the aquatic humans' fate, grant Aquaman new powers, with a ritual meant to give him the power of the "dark gods" of Atlantis, involving his new aquatic hand and the bones of his severed former one. Aquaman succeeds in raising back a big portion of Sub Diego, saving his inhabitants. As he expected, he pays a difficult price; he is transfigured in a monstrous, amnesiac and almost mad form, the Dweller in the Depths.

J'onn continues following Black Adam's trail, distracting his thoughts from the Justice Society, once again united to give aid to the suffering populace. He finds him battling the Teen Titans, asking vengeance for their supposed betrayal of Osiris. Over the course of two confrontations, he kills Young Frankenstein and Terra. This causes J'onn to come back to Earth, and alert Checkmate. Kate Spencer's cover as Manhunter is almost blown; still her pursuing of the greater good convinced J'onn to enact another step in his maturation: he goes to his former police district as John Jones, revealing himself to his former friends, and burning his former detective agency to the ground to prevent himself from ever assuming a disguise again. Not even Captain Marvel can beat Adam and asks the Egyptian Gods to remove Adam's powers, but they tell him he has their blessing.

Finally Black Adam is delayed in China by the Great Ten. At first, the assembled heroes can do nothing, as China has promised to fire its nuclear missiles if they cross the Great Wall of China. Finally, the Justice Society and the other superheroes are allowed to join in battle. J'onn himself shows up, fighting actively with Adam, and using his link with him to fill his mind with images from the destruction of Mars and from every death he has caused during World War III. Black Adam is halted for a few minutes, just the time needed for Captain Marvel to force a magic lightning bolt on him as Power Girl and Alan Scott hold him, turning Black Adam back to Teth-Adam and changing his magic word into an unknown one. However the lightning tears him from Kara and Alan, but he is caught by Atom-Smasher as he falls. This lightning also wounds J'onn, who nevertheless is able to awake in his One Year Later form, freed from the forced link with Adam's mind, but willing to rethink his whole life as a Martian being on Earth, and no more an alien being pretending to be as human as possible.

From their satellite base, the Monitors declare the end of "World War III", intended as the war of one man against the whole world, but they do express fear for an even darker event looming over Earth.

Collected editions
Both stories have been collected into trade paperbacks:
 JLA Vol. 6: World War III (collects JLA #34-41, 2000)
 DC: World War III (collects 52 Week 50 and World War III four-issue mini-series, 2007)

See also
World War III in popular culture

References

1999 comics debuts
2000 comics endings
Comics by Grant Morrison
Novels set during World War III